Shahid Khudiram Metro Station is a station of the Kolkata Metro close to Dhalai Bridge in Briji, Garia, a southern neighbourhood of Kolkata, India. The station is named in honour of the Bengali revolutionary Khudiram Bose. The elevated structure is located above the drainage channel between Pranabananda Road and Garia Station Road at the west side of the Eastern Metropolitan Bypass.

History

Construction

The station

Structure
Shahid Khudiram elevated metro station is situated on the Kolkata Metro Line 1 of Kolkata Metro.

Station layout

Facilities
ATM is available here.

Connections

Bus
Bus route number 45B, JM2, S101/1 (Mini), S101/1A (Mini), S112 (Mini), AS3, C26, S6A, S9C, S24, AC14, AC24A etc serve the station.

Train
Garia railway station of Indian Railways is situated nearby.

See also

Kolkata
List of Kolkata Metro stations
Transport in Kolkata
Kolkata Metro Rail Corporation
Kolkata Suburban Railway
Kolkata Monorail
Trams in Kolkata
Garia
E.M. Bypass
List of rapid transit systems
List of metro systems

References

External links

 
 
 Official Website for line 1
 UrbanRail.Net – descriptions of all metro systems in the world, each with a schematic map showing all stations.

Kolkata Metro stations
Railway stations opened in 2010
Railway stations in Kolkata